Loire-Atlantique (before 1957: Loire-Inférieure) is a department in Pays de la Loire on the west coast of France, named after the river Loire and the Atlantic Ocean. It had a population of 1,429,272 in 2019.

History

Loire-Atlantique is one of the original 83 departments created during the French Revolution on March 4, 1790. Originally, it was named Loire-Inférieure, but its name was changed in March 9, 1957 to Loire-Atlantique.

The area is part of the historical Duchy of Brittany, and contains what many people still consider to be Brittany's capital, Nantes. However, during World War II, the Vichy Government set up a system of regional prefectures  whereby on 19 April 1941 Loire-Atlantique was excluded from the Region of Brittany and united with neighbouring French departments, under the lead of Angers.

After the war these administrative changes were reimplemented in the 1955 boundary changes intended to optimise the management of the regions. There has since been a series of campaigns reflecting a strong local mood to have the department reintegrated with Brittany.

Geography
Loire-Atlantique is part of the current region of Pays de la Loire and is surrounded by the department of Morbihan, Ille-et-Vilaine, Maine-et-Loire, and Vendée, with the Atlantic on the west.

Principal towns

The most populous commune is Nantes, the prefecture. As of 2019, there are 9 communes with more than 20,000 inhabitants:

Demographics 
Population development since 1801:

Culture

Upper Brittany's indigenous language is Gallo, a romance language related to French. The number of Gallo language speakers has been in steady decline since the early 20th century. The language is neither official nor taught in primary or secondary education. In the south of the département (Pays de Retz), the local language was Poitevin dialect.

The Breton language, a Celtic language, native to Lower Brittany, was historically spoken in the western area of Loire-Atlantique, and up to 1920 in Batz-sur-Mer. This area (Guérande, Le Croisic, and La Baule) has a rather Breton toponymy: for instance, Guérande originates from the Breton Gwenn Rann (white or pure place).

The folklore and musical traditions of eastern or Upper Brittany are generally similar to those of western or Lower Brittany.

Politics

The president of the Departmental Council is Michel Menard, elected in July 2021.

Current Deputies of the National Assembly

Current Senators

Transport

The département operates the Lila network (fr) of interurban buses, which link its villages, towns and cities. The urban areas of Nantes and Saint-Nazaire operate their own urban transport networks, known as TAN and STRAN (fr) respectively.

By rail, the regional trains and buses of the TER Pays de la Loire link major towns and cities of the Pays de la Loire and adjoining regions, including those of the département. Nantes is on the TGV network, with high speed trains running to Paris by the LGV Atlantique in just over 2 hours.

Nantes Atlantique Airport, located 8 km to the southwest of the city of Nantes, serves the département and surrounding areas. It is the biggest airport in northwestern France, linking with several French, North African and European cities, as well as Montreal in Canada.

Tourism

See also
Cantons of the Loire-Atlantique department
Communes of the Loire-Atlantique department
Arrondissements of the Loire-Atlantique department
La Baule - Guérande Peninsula

References

External links

  Prefecture
  Departmental Council
  Loire-Atlantique Tourism

 
Pays de la Loire
1790 establishments in France
Departments of Pays de la Loire
States and territories established in 1790